Louis-Philippe Loncke is a Belgian explorer, adventurer and motivational speaker.  In 2008, he achieved the world first crossing on foot of the length of the Simpson desert, which was a North to South traverse passing through its geographical center. In 2018, he traversed Tasmania during the austral winter without resupplies and was nicknamed the Mad Belgian by some Australians.

Early life and education
Loncke was born in Mouscron, Belgium to a family of furniture makers.  He studied engineering in Brussels at ECAM, a master in Industrial management in KU Leuven and treasury management at the University of Antwerp Management School.

Career

Management consultant
Loncke started his career as logistics manager. Since 1999, he has built experience in over 10 corporate companies in various positions. He has been working as management consultant since 2007 mainly in IT. The skills he acquired in the corporate world allowed him to efficiently plan his expeditions. He is also self-taught in photography, SEO, marketing and communications. From 2006 to 2013, he was volunteering at NGO Art in All of Us and was elected member of the board of directors in 2010.

Adventurer and explorer
Loncke started traveling alone in 2000. In 2002, he was sent to Singapore for work and learned scuba diving. To fulfill this passion he traveled for a year in Oceania between 2004 and 2005. He started hiking and heard about adventurers and explorers; and became interested after seeing the world acclaimed film Alone across Australia. Back in Belgium, he met author and adventurer Sylvain Tesson who encouraged him to continue. Loncke left again in 2006 to Australia to start his first three expeditions.

His first solo unresupplied traverse of the Tasmanian Wilderness brought him the first sponsors and recognition among Australian explorers. After a year in Australia, he went back to Belgium and started planning for a series of several world first expeditions, the first being to attempt crossing the Simpson desert at its longest distance.

He has organised charity expeditions involving media buzz including the highest chocolate tasting, on Everest. In July 2010, he trekked across Iceland between its extreme latitude from North to South. He spoofed an Icelandic promotional video that got viral in Iceland. He has announced a return to Iceland to attempt doing the journey during the winter.
Both his Simpson and Iceland expeditions involved a science program of the MSH of Paris named Stress and decision taking in extreme environment.

Expeditions

World firsts
 2006 - Unsupported crossing of the West MacDonnell National Park
 2006 - Unsupported traverse of Fraser Island
 2007 - Unresupplied crossing of the Tasmanian Wilderness
 2008 - Unsupported crossing of the Simpson Desert from North to South and passing through the center.
 2010 - Unsupported traverse of Iceland in the Summer
 2011 - BelgiKayak expedition, touring by kayak the Belgian waterways.
 2012 : Crossing of Poland by human power from Mount Rysy across the Tatras Mountains by foot, then by kayak on the Vistula to the Baltic sea. He spoke about the expedition at TEDxWarsaw 2013.
 2013 - TitiKayak expedition with Gadiel Sánchez Rivera. Full tour by kayak of lake Titicaca. Creation of the first geotagged photographic inventory of the lake: they took GPS coordinates of the location of the limit between the water and the ground and alongside photographs of the background. They also took underwater photos on the Northern Bolivian coast to locate the living habitat of the giant frog Telmatobius culeus. He told the purpose of the expedition at TEDxFlanders.
 2015 - Unsupported traverse of Death Valley National Park from North to South
 2016 - Salar trek 2. Unsupported traverse of Salar de Coipasa and Salar de Uyuni on foot. These two Salt flats are located in the Bolivian Altiplano and are the remains of Lake Tauca.
2018 - Tasmania Winter Trek. North to South traverse of Tasmania during the austral winter, without food or gas resupplies, without using roads and only sleeping in a tent.
2020 - HRP2020. Crossing the Pyrenees from the Atlantic Ocean to the Mediterranean Sea, without supplies, without assistance and sleeping only in a tent; and climbing the summit of Pico Aneto. Its route follows a variant of the Haute Randonnée Pyrénéenne
 2021 - He walks and packrafts the entire Kungsleden trail unsupported, climbing underway also Skierfe and the Kebnekaise North and South summits.

Charity and cultural expeditions
 2009 - Chocolate Sherpa expedition, walking 400 km from Kathmandu to Everest Base Camp and back to Lukla distributing chocolate.

Scientific and other expeditions
 2013 - Cordell expedition to Clipperton Island. Scientific and DXpedition with callsign TX5K.
 2013 - Marañón River expedition. Joined for 6 days the 1 month rafting and kayaking of the upper part of the river.
 2013 - Salar trek expedition. He attempted, but failed, to traverse Salar de Coipasa and Salar de Uyuni on foot without any resupply.
 2016 - Unsupported partial crossing of the Simpson Desert from West to East from Old Andado to Poeppel Corner and passing through the center.

Challenges
 2020 - The Everest Bueren Challenge, climbing up and down the stairs of the Montagne de Bueren 135 times with a 15kg backpack.
 2021 - Confined in my Tent, living 1 week on a 5m² platform hanging 10m above the ground.
 2022 - Unsupported speed record on the GR 70 Stevenson hiking trail.

Films
From 2021, he started to produce films about his expeditions and challenges. The films are released online or screened at festivals.
 2021 - The Mad Belgian: Keep walking
 2022 - The Mad Belgian: Confined in My Tent

Awards and recognition

 In 2009, he was awarded young talent of the year by the Baillis of Mouscron.
 Outer Edge magazine has selected in its February–March 2011 issue Loncke's Simpson desert crossing being in the top 10 Australian expeditions to the edge of reason.
 Accepted as member of the Explorers Club in 2010 and elected to Fellow in 2014.
 Becoming Fellow of the Royal Geographic Society in 2011
 In September 2011, the Jane Goodall Institute Belgium nominates him as goodwill ambassador for the Roots & Shoots program.
 Selected by the LOCOG to carry the Olympic Flame through Choppington on 15 June 2012.
 Finalist Photoshoot Awards contest OCEAN 2013, category Pollution.
  At the European parliament in Brussels, on 7 May 2014, Jane Goodall made him Jane Goodall Institute Knight for Youth, Animals and Plants in the Order of the Iguana.
  A the ISPO fair in Munich, he is awarded European Adventurer of the Year 2016.
 He is enthroned Honorary Bailli of Mouscron in October 2017
Ranked #3 of the Top 10 expeditions of 2018 according to ExplorersWeb

References

External links
 of Louis-Philippe Loncke

1977 births
Living people
Belgian explorers
Fellows of the Royal Geographical Society
Fellows of the Explorers Club
People from Mouscron